Jaihind Vayanasala is a library situated in Puthenthope, India.

History 

The library was established in the year 1946, at the time of the non-violent independence movement in India. The name of the library stems from this era; Jai meaning Victory, and Hind meaning India. The library proudly exists as the cultural center of Puthenthope. It is the most important cultural center in the Indian coastal area. A traditional boat race and drama festival are the noticeable events during the Christmas period.
The cultural changes and political atmosphere before and after the independent period which inspired the young generation of the coastal village and therefore, they decided to established a library with the aim of establishing a liberal and secular way of life in this coastal village. Even though the influence of the church was immense during this time, the young people of this era including Joseph D'cruz, William Sir, Don, Bosco and many others had democratically decided to select the name Jaihind instead of selecting the name of any of patron Saints. The dramas of KPSC, the songs of ONV, and novels of progressive writers and the progressive movement itself in Kerala had rekindle the flame for a change in the educational aspirations and to select a cultural path which was entirely different other parts of the coastal villages in Trivandrum.  The establishment of this library itself can be considered as an inspiration for the young people in this village for reading the better books during that era where books were not abundant in these fishing villages. Jaihind library created a space for the cultural and sports activities for this coastal village and I am happy to say that this still continuing in Puthenthope after decades of changes.  Only few people in this village are now involved in fishing activities and the majority of the young generations of this village are migrants who moved out of this village for making their livelihood and now they are working in Gulf countries, Europe, USA, Canada and Australia.

Sections in Library 
This cultural center has been helping to develop communal activities which includes 
cultural and sports activities during the festival season especially in Christmas time.

External links
 Jaihind Vayanasala
 Directions

Libraries in Kerala
Buildings and structures in Thiruvananthapuram
Libraries established in 1946